Tynset is a municipality in Innlandet county, Norway. It is located in the traditional district of Østerdalen. The administrative centre of the municipality is the village of Tynset. Other villages in Tynset include Fådalen, Fåset, Telneset, Tylldalen, and Yset.

The  municipality is the 43rd largest by area out of the 356 municipalities in Norway. Tynset is the 167th most populous municipality in Norway with a population of 5,581.

General information
The parish of Tønsæt was established as a municipality on 1 January 1838 (see formannskapsdistrikt law). In 1864, the southern part of the municipality (population: 3,216) was separated to form the new municipality of Lille-Elvdal. This left Tynset with 2,975 residents. During the 1960s, there were many municipal mergers across Norway due to the work of the Schei Committee. On 1 January 1966, the neighboring municipality of Kvikne was dissolved and on that date the southern part of Kvikne (population: 664) was merged into Tynset municipality. On 1 January 1970, the Garlia farm (population: 5) was transferred from Tynset to the neighboring Rennebu Municipality (which also meant switching from Hedmark county to Sør-Trøndelag county). On 1 January 1984, the unpopulated Spekedalen area was transferred from Tynset to the neighboring Rendalen Municipality.

Name
The municipality (originally the parish) is named after the old  farm, since the first Tynset Church was built here. The first element is the genitive case of the river name  (now spelled ). The last element of the name derives from the word  which means "homestead" or "farm". (The meaning of the river name is unknown.) Prior to 1918, the name was written "Tønset" and it was pronounced Teunset with the "eu" diphthong equivalent to that in the French word ).

Coat of arms
The coat of arms was granted on 18 October 1985. The arms show the silver/gray head of a moose on a blue background. It was chosen to symbolize the abundance of moose in the area.

Churches
The Church of Norway has four parishes within the municipality of Tynset. It is part of the Nord-Østerdal prosti (deanery) in the Diocese of Hamar.

Geography

Tynset is the urban centre for the northern Østerdalen part of Innlandet county in the central area of mainland Norway. To the northeast lies the municipality of Tolga; south of Tynset are Rendalen and Alvdal municipalities; and to the west is Folldal municipality. In the neighboring county of Trøndelag, Tynset is bordered to the north by the municipalities of Rennebu and Midtre Gauldal, and to the west by Oppdal municipality.

Tynset is known for its vast areas of forest and mountain, which are ideal for skiing, walking, cycling, hunting, and fishing. In many areas are signposted paths and ski tracks are ploughed in winter. The river Glåma has several side rivers including the Sivilla and Ya. The Fådalen valley and the lake Savalen have many tourist activities. The lakes Innerdalsvatnet and Falningsjøen also lie in the municipality.

Tynset has many wildlife areas including the geological formation at Ripan and Gammeldalen. At Ripan, there is a lake formed by glaciation during the last ice age and at Gammeldalen there are some beautifully formed corries from the same period.

Tynset has many historic mountain farms (seter) that are still in use in the high parts of the countryside. It is possible to visit these farms while hiking. Tynset municipality also rents chalets, which used to belong to some of these mountain farms.

Government
All municipalities in Norway, including Tynset, are responsible for primary education (through 10th grade), outpatient health services, senior citizen services, unemployment and other social services, zoning, economic development, and municipal roads. The municipality is governed by a municipal council of elected representatives, which in turn elects a mayor.  The municipality falls under the Østre Innlandet District Court and the Eidsivating Court of Appeal.

Municipal council
The municipal council  of Tynset is made up of 27 representatives that are elected to four year terms. The party breakdown of the council is as follows:

Mayors
This is a list of the mayors of Tynset since it was established on 1 January 1838.

1838-1839: Ansten Embretsen
1839-1843: Andreas Lie Bull
1843-1847: Ansten Embretsen
1847-1849: Nils Nilsen
1849-1851: Ole J. Hansen
1851-1855: Ole Madsen Fløtten
1855-1857: Ole J. Hansen
1857-1869: Jon Steen
1869-1873: Melchior Tangen
1873-1893: Lars Hektoen
1893-1898: Tore Aaen
1899-1901: Ole J. Steen
1902-1904: Tore Aaen
1905-1910: Ole J. Steen
1910-1919: Hans Bakker (Liberal Party)
1920-1928: Olaf Rønning (Liberal Party)
1929-1934: Hans E. Eggen (Farmers' Party)
1935-1940: Bersvend Ordertrøen (Liberal Party)
1941-1945: Per N. Mælen
1945: Bersvend Ordertrøen (Liberal Party)
1946-1947: Bernhard Øyan (Labour Party)
1948-1951: Bersvend Ordertrøen (Liberal Party)
1952-1956: Per E. Hansæl (Farmers' Party)
1957-1959: Annar Aaen (Farmers' Party)
1959-1971: Per Often (Centre Party)
1971-1987: Per N. Hagen (Centre Party)
1987-1991: Gunnar Jacobsen (Labour Party)
1991-1999: Olav Distad (Centre Party)
1999-2005: Dag Henrik Sandbakken (Centre Party)
2005-2007: Borgar Valle (Centre Party)
2007-2015: Bersvend Salbu (Socialist Left Party)
2015–present: Merete Myhre Moen (Centre Party)

Climate
Tynset has a boreal climate (continental subarctic climate). Situated inland on the valley floor at 480 meter altitude and sheltered by mountain ranges, Tynset can see strong inversion for long periods. The all-time high is  recorded 25 June 2020, while July has seen  on 27 July 2008.
Tynset sees sparse precipitation with only  annually, with February - April as the driest season.

Transportation

The municipality can be reached via railroad, road, and air. The main Norwegian National Road 3 runs through the municipality (it is the shortest route between the cities of Oslo and Trondheim). The Rondevegen road connects Tynset to Lillehammer (to the south), Røros (to the northeast), and continues further into Sweden. County Road 30, which passes through Rendalen, also continues through Tynset into Sweden. The Rørosbanen railway line connects Tynset with the major cities of Oslo and Trondheim. Tynset also hosts an aerodrome that is used by smaller aircraft.

Kickers

Tynset produces the traditional Norwegian form of transportation, the "kicker". The world's largest kicker is located in the Tynset Square in the village of Tynset. This sculpture is four times the size of a normal kicker.

Economy
With a population of about 5,400 people, Tynset is the urban centre of the Nord-Østerdalen region. Although it is a modern business and shopping centre with a wide variety of commercial activities, agriculture and forestry are still the traditional ways of making a living. Municipal administration and service industries, such as the computer industry, law, finance, and construction are also beginning to play an increasing role. Tynset has most of the functions of a regional centre because of its schools and hospital, and many of the region's intermunicipal services have naturally been positioned in Tynset: The Family Centre, Centre for School Psychology, and others. A factory in Tynset used to produce latex Troll souvenirs, but production moved abroad and it no longer does this.

Culture

Tynset has a rich cultural life with a huge range of organisations in sports, music, drama, the arts, and youth work.
Kulturhuset
The Centre for The Arts opened in 1988. The centre houses concerts, plays, a cinema, library, art exhibitions, rehearsals, reunions, conferences, and festivals. The  also has a café.

Tynsethallene
Tynset's first sports hall was built in 1986. A second sports hall was opened ten years later. A swimming pool and smaller gymnastics gall in the building connects them to form a complete set of sports facilities.

Savalen
Savalen is known internationally for its speed skating ice rink, where many national and international records have been achieved. The Savalen area has become a place that is specially designed for the handicapped, which includes wheelchair paths and a specially equipped fishing pier. Savalen has become a well-known holiday and vacation area.

Early Skateboard in Norway
Tynset had one of Norway's very first pro skateboard vert ramp, it was constructed 1981-82 by Erik Snedsbøl and located in the forest near Tela Sag & Høvleri on Telneset. It was one of the first pro vert-ramp's during the prohibition period (1978–89) in Norway. From 7 September 1978 to 9 May 1989, skateboarding was completely banned in Norway. At that time, Norway was the only country in the world where it was forbidden to sell, buy or stand on a skateboard. The ban was introduced by the Nordli government and lifted by the Brundtland government, both emanating from Arbeiderpartiet (Norwegian Labour Party). 
Snedsbøl's skateboard ramp was the first to get permission for use in Norway during the prohibition period, and contributed to the softening of the Law of Norway. The newspaper Arbeidets Rett by Jan E. Øvergård published an article on 12 October 1983. The ramp was later published in the Swedish skateboard magazine Uppåt Väggarna (no. 5/6, 1983).

Notable people 

 Anders Rambech (1767 in Kvikne – 1836) a district stipendiary magistrate and politician
 Bjørnstjerne Bjørnson (1832 in Kvikne – 1910) a poet and writer who received the 1903 Nobel Prize in Literature.
 Odd Aukrust (1915 in Tynset – 2008) a Norwegian economist
 Olav Gjærevoll (1916 Tynset – 1994) a botanist, academic and politician
 Fridtjof Frank Gundersen (1934 in Tynset – 2011) a professor of jurisprudence and politician
 Gert Nygårdshaug (born 1946 at Tynset) an author of poems, children's books and crime novels
 Erik Snedsbøl (born 1965 Stavnäs, Sweden), artist, photographer, writer, musician, skateboarder, Straight edge
 Bersvend Salbu (born 1968) a Norwegian farmer, politician and Mayor of Tynset 2007-2015
 Ellen Brekken (born 1985 in Tynset) jazz musician, plays upright bass, bass guitar and the tuba

Sport 
 Willy Olsen (born 1950 in Tynset) a retired speed skater, competed at the 1972 Winter Olympics
 Solrun Flatås (born 1967 in Tynset) a cyclist, competed at the 2000 Summer Olympics
 Tor Halvor Bjørnstad (born 1978) a retired cross-country skier, biathlete and winter triathlete; lives in Tynset
 Kai Olav Ryen (born 1978 in Tynset) a footballer with 223 club caps
 Ole Erik Midtskogen (born 1995 in Tynset) a footballer playing for Eliteserien club Odds Ballklubb

Attractions

The following are some of the attractions in the area. The distance from the municipal center of Tynset is shown.
Kvikne Mines in Odden. The remains of mining operations begun in 1632. (60 min.)
Kvikne Church. A cruciform timber church built in 1652, with a richly decorated interior. The altar is an example of one of Norway's finest Renaissance altarpieces and the church is adorned with staves (planks) on which one can see Viking graffiti, an 11th-century crucifix and other artifacts from the Viking period. (45 min.)
Vollan Farm and Chapel. The farm was originally built in the mining period, the earliest part of which dates from the 17th century. This is one of the few farms in the country with its own private chapel. (45 min.)
Vollandagan: An annual festival connected with the traditional life of Vollan.
Bjørgan parsonage, Kvikne. The birthplace of the author Bjørnstjerne Bjørnson. (50 min.)
Soapstone quarry, Kvikneskogen, dates from 400 to 600 BC. (30 min. + 45 min. on foot).
Røstvangen Mines. The remains of a mining community from the beginning of the 20th century. It survived for only 17 years and was ruined by the greatest bankruptcy of the period. (25 min. + 15 min. on foot).
Eidsfossen Power Station, a decommissioned hydroelectric plant 5 km south of Yset that formerly powered the Røstvangen Mines.
Tynset Bygdemuseum. Tynset's village museum is 1 kilometer from the town centre and contains exemplar housing from early times to the present.
Tynset Church. An octagonal church that was built in 1795 by the architect of a larger example in Røros. The church displays a fine, gilded pulpit over the altar, which is peculiar to this area of Norway. A smaller copy of this church was built in 1825 at Bardu in the northern county of Troms by the contractor (and native of Tynset) Ola Olsen Lundberg and is accurate many details.
Ramsmoen museumssenter: Exhibitions throughout the year, located in the centre of Tynset.
Garborgdagan. An annual festival built around the work of the authors Hulda Garborg and Arne Garborg. Held in Tynset kulturhus and at Kolbotn, Garborg's home for many years.
Tynsetutstillinga. An annual exhibition held in Galleri Elgen in Tynset kulturhus, featuring well-known Norwegian artists.
Tylldalen Church. Built in 1736, the rich wall painting survived the puritan period by being painted over, thus preserving its original colours. A fine altar dominates the sanctuary and fine ceiling paintings, displaying the Swedish royal arms, make this a fine example of Norwegian late-baroque architecture.
Tylldalen bygdetun. Tylldalen's village museum (20 min.) A biennial play for St. Olav's Day is Norway's second oldest historical outdoor play.

References

External links

Municipal fact sheet from Statistics Norway 
Tynset website 
Tynset parish: includes information on the church parish and a series of virtual tours

 
Municipalities of Innlandet
1838 establishments in Norway